Wiltshire was a constituency of the House of Commons of England from 1290 to 1707, of the House of Commons of Great Britain from 1707 to 1800 and of the House of Commons of the United Kingdom from 1801 to 1832. It was represented by two Members of Parliament (MPs), elected by the bloc vote system.

History

Boundaries
The constituency consisted of the whole historic county of Wiltshire. (Although Wiltshire contained a number of boroughs each of which elected two Members in their own right, the boroughs were not excluded from the county constituency, and owning property within a borough could confer a vote at the county election.)

Medieval and Tudor period
In medieval times, the custom in Wiltshire as elsewhere was for Members called knights of the shire to be elected at the county court by the suitors to the court, which meant the small number of nobles and other landowners who were tenants in chief of the Crown. Such county elections were held on the same day as the election of the members for the boroughs. Thus we find it recorded that in the first year of the reign of Henry V, "at a full County Court held at Wilton, Twenty-Six persons chose the Knights for the County, and the same individuals elected Two Citizens respectively for New Sarum, Old Sarum, Wilton, Devizes, Malmesbury, Marlborough and Calne."

From 1430, the Forty Shilling Freeholder Act extended the right to vote to every man who possessed freehold property within the county valued for the purposes of land tax at £2 
() or more per year; it was not necessary for the freeholder to occupy his land, nor even in later years to be resident in the county.

Once the vote was no longer confined to the richest men in the county, voters quickly came to expect the candidates for whom they voted to meet their expenses in travelling to the poll and to entertain them when they got there. At the Wiltshire election of 1559, one of the candidates, George Penruddock, was Steward to William Herbert, 1st Earl of Pembroke: at the close of polling, Penruddock invited all the voters, as well as his opponents and the Sheriff, to a dinner at Wilton House, Lord Pembroke's seat.

County elections were held at a single polling place. In the early period this would have been wherever in the county the Sheriff chose to hold the relevant county court, but eventually there was a fixed venue, at Wilton. Voters from the rest of the county had to travel there to exercise their franchise. A detailed account survives of how this worked in the mid-Tudor period, as there was litigation over a dispute at the election of 1559 in the Court of Star Chamber. At this election there were three candidates for the two seats, but it appears that the choice for one seat was unanimous. The other was contested between George Penruddock, the Steward to the Earl of Pembroke mentioned above, a member of the previous Parliament, and Sir John Thynne, who had previously represented boroughs in the county and who had just begun to build the great house at Longleat. The election proceeded by the Sheriff sitting in one place to take votes for Thynne, and his deputy sitting in another to take votes for Penruddock. There was no secret ballot at this period. Each side's agents watched the voting and had the opportunity to challenge the credentials of anyone they believed not to be a valid voter. Penruddock was the easy victor, but Thynne then challenged his election, claiming that many of his votes were invalid (which he had already had the chance to prove and had failed to do), and that Penruddock himself was ineligible, being neither resident in Wiltshire nor of sufficiently high social status to be a Knight of the Shire. These objections might have had more weight were he not already one of the sitting members. The Sheriff declared Penruddock elected, but afterwards Thynne's supporters quietly persuaded him to change his mind and gave him a bond for £300 to indemnify him against the consequences; he therefore sent in the return of election naming Thynne rather than Penruddock as duly elected. The size of the bond seems to have been finely judged, since when the Attorney General prosecuted the Sheriff in the Star Chamber he was fined £200 and Penruddock was awarded a further £100 in damages; but the Sheriff was also sentenced to a year's imprisonment.

18th and 19th century elections
As time went on, the treating at elections became more elaborate and more openly corrupt, and at the same time the size of the electorate expanded considerably. In the 15th century, the forty-shilling freeholders must still have constituted a very small number of voters, but social changes and rising land values both acted eventually to broaden the franchise. Those qualified to vote were still a fraction of total population: at the time of the Great Reform Act in 1832, Wiltshire had a total population of approximately 240,000, yet just 6,403 votes were cast in the county constituency at the 1818 election, the last general election at which there was a contested election in Wiltshire. This was nevertheless enough to put a substantial burden on the candidates' purses, making the cost of a contested election very high – a by-election in 1772 was said to have cost £20,000. Contested elections were therefore rare, potential candidates preferring to canvass support beforehand and usually not insisting on a vote being taken unless they were confident of winning; the county was contested at four of the six general elections between 1701 and 1713, but in all but one of the remaining twenty-three general elections until 1832, Wiltshire's two Members were elected unopposed.

Wiltshire was a predominantly rural county, though the freeholders from the biggest towns (Salisbury, Trowbridge, Bradford-on-Avon, Westbury and Warminster) made up almost a fifth of the vote in 1818. It succeeded in remaining independent of any domination by the local nobility and generally chose members of the county's landed gentry as its members. Wiltshire was unusual in that by the 18th century it has formalised the process of picking its candidates to some degree, the decision being made by a body called the Deptford Club (named after the inn where it met). The club consisted of leading local members of both gentry and nobility and was said to have been in existence since 1729. Once the club had met in private and made its decision, the choice was ratified at a public meeting, and only on a small number of occasions did a disappointed candidate take the matter to a formal vote at the ensuing election. However, in the last half century before Reform, two rival clubs (the Devizes Club and the Beckhampton Club) took over the nominating function, and in 1812 an independent candidate, Paul Methuen, stood against one of the nominees of the clubs and defeated him.

Abolition
Under the Great Reform Act of 1832, the constituency was abolished, and the county was split into two two-member divisions for Parliamentary purposes, Northern Wiltshire and Southern Wiltshire constituencies.

Members of Parliament

1295–1640

1640–1832

Notes

Elections

See also
List of former United Kingdom Parliament constituencies
Unreformed House of Commons

References
D. Brunton & D. H. Pennington, Members of the Long Parliament (London: George Allen & Unwin, 1954)
John Cannon, Parliamentary Representation 1832 – England and Wales (Cambridge: Cambridge University Press, 1973)
Cobbett's Parliamentary history of England, from the Norman Conquest in 1066 to the year 1803 (London: Thomas Hansard, 1808) 
 Esther S Cope and Willson H Coates (eds), Camden Fourth Series, Volume 19: Proceedings of the Short Parliament of 1640 (London: Royal Historical Society, 1977)
 Lewis Namier & John Brooke, The History of Parliament: The House of Commons 1754–1790 (London: HMSO, 1964)
 J. E. Neale, The Elizabethan House of Commons (London: Jonathan Cape, 1949)
 T. H. B. Oldfield, The Representative History of Great Britain and Ireland (London: Baldwin, Cradock & Joy, 1816)
 Charles Henry Parry (ed.), The Parliaments and Councils of England (London: John Murray, 1839)
 J Holladay Philbin, Parliamentary Representation 1832 – England and Wales (New Haven: Yale University Press, 1965)
 
 List of members nominated for Parliament of 1653 (British History Online)

Parliamentary constituencies in Wiltshire (historic)
Constituencies of the Parliament of the United Kingdom established in 1290
Constituencies of the Parliament of the United Kingdom disestablished in 1832